Walter Rossi (July 12, 1894 – February 12, 1978) was a sound editor who won 1 Academy Award and was nominated for 2 more Academy Awards.

Oscar nominations

1957 Academy Awards-Award for The Enemy Below in the category of Best Special Effects . Won.
1965 Academy Awards-Nominated for Von Ryan's Express in the category of Best Sound Editing. Lost to The Great Race.
1966 Academy Awards-Nominated for Fantastic Voyage in the category of Best Sound Editing. Lost to Grand Prix.

Filmography

The Robe (1953)
Prince of Players (1955)
The Enemy Below (1957)
The Barbarian and the Geisha (1958)
Von Ryan's Express (1965)
Fantastic Voyage (1966)
Motorista Sem Limites (1970)

References

External links

Best Visual Effects Academy Award winners
American sound editors
1978 deaths
1894 births